Babić (Serbian Cyrillic: Бабић) is a  Croatian, Bosniak and Serbian family name. It is the 3rd most frequent surname in Croatia and is derived from the common Slavic word for grandmother or old woman: baba.

Geographical distribution
As of 2014, the frequency of the surname Babić was highest in Bosnia and Herzegovina (1: 298), followed by Croatia (1: 394), Serbia (1: 470), Montenegro (1: 715) and Slovenia (1: 801).

People
Notable people with the surname include:

 Alen Babić (born 1990), Croatian boxer
 Andrej Babić, Croatian songwriter
 Anto Babić (1899-1974), Bosnian historian
 Bekim Babić (born 1975), Bosnian-Herzegovinian cross-country skier
 Branko Babić (born 1950), Serbian football manager and former player
 Dejan Babić (born 1989), Serbian footballer
 Dragan Babić (1937–2013), Serbian journalist
 Draginja Babić (1886-1915), Serbian doctor
 Dragutin Babić (1897-1945), Croatian footballer
 Dušan Babić (born 1986), Bosnian middle-distance runner
 Franjo Babić (1908–1945), Croatian writer and journalist
 Golub Babić (1824-1910), Bosnian Serb guerilla chief
 Gregory Victor Babic (born 1963), Australian author
 Filip Babić (born 1995), Serbian footballer
 Ilija Babić (born 2002), Serbian footballer
 Ivan Babić (1904–1982), Croatian soldier
 Ivan Babić (born 1981), Serbian footballer
 Ivan Babić (born 1984), Croatian footballer
 Krunoslav Babić (1875–1953), Croatian zoologist
 Lavra Babič (born 1987), Slovenian freestyle swimmer
 Ljubo Babić (1890–1974), Croatian painter
 Ljubomir Babić a.k.a. Ksaver Šandor Gjalski (1854–1935), Croatian writer
 Luka Babić (born 1991), Croatian basketball player
 Luka Babić (born 1994), Montenegrin volleyball player
 Mario Babić (born 1992), Croatian footballer
 Mark Babic (born 1973), Australian footballer
 Marko Babić (1965–2007), Croatian army officer
 Marko Babić (born 1981), Croatian footballer
 Matija Babić (born 1978), Croatian Internet journalist
 Matko Babić (born 1998), Croatian footballer
 Mijo Babić (1903-1941), Croatian fascist soldier
 Milan Babić (born 1955), Serbian footballer
 Milan Babić (1956–2006), Serbian leader
 Milenko Babić (born 1947), Serbian politician
 Milica Babić-Jovanović (1909-1968), Serbian costume designer
 Miloš Babić (1904-1968), Yugoslav artist
 Miloš Babić (born 1968), former Serbian basketball player
 Miloš Babić (born 1981), Bosnian-Herzegovinian footballer
 Nikola Babić (1905-1974), Croatian footballer
 Rašo Babić (born 1977), Serbian footballer
 Safet Babic (born 1981), German politician of Bosnian descent
 Saša Babić (born 1989), Croatian futsal player
 Sava Babić (born 1934), Serbian writer
 Silvija Mrakovčić, née Babić, Croatian long jumper and triple jumper
 Siniša Babić (born 1991), Serbian footballer
 Snežana Babić (born 1967), Serbian singer and actress
 Srđan Babić (born 1996), Serbian footballer
 Staša Babić, Serbian archaeologist
 Stjepan Babić (born 1925), Croatian linguist
 Stjepan Babić (born 1988), Croatian footballer
 Toma Babić (c 1680-1750), Croatian writer and Franciscan priest
 Vanja Babić (born 1981), Serbian taekwondo player
 Vladica Babić (born 1995), Montenegrin tennis player
 Vlado Babić (born 1960), Serbian politician
 Valentin Babić (born 1981), Croatian footballer
 Zdenko Babić (born 1960), Croatian basketball player
 Željko Babić (born 1972), Croatian handball coach and former player
 Zeljko Babic a.k.a. Sean Babic (born 1976), former Australian footballer
 Zoran Babić (born 1971), Serbian politician

See also 
 Babich
 Babits

References 

Bosnian surnames
Croatian surnames
Serbian surnames